Gawad Mabini is an honor given by the Republic of the Philippines.

History 
Created by Presidential Decree No. 490, the Gawad Mabini may be conferred upon personnel of the DFA, both in the Home Office and in the Foreign Service, and upon Filipinos who have rendered distinguished service or promoted the interests of the Republic of the Philippines at home and abroad.

Award 
The Gawad Mabini may be conferred by the Secretary of Foreign Affairs in the name and by authority of the President.

The Gawad Mabini shall be conferred on July 22 of every year, to commemorate the birth anniversary of Apolinario Mabini, the first Secretary of Foreign Affairs of the Republic of the Philippines.

Ranks 
The Gawad Mabini shall be composed of three ranks :

Grand Cross (GCrM) (Dakilang Kamanong) - Conferred upon a former or incumbent Secretary of Foreign Affairs, Chief of Mission, cabinet member or other high official who headed a Philippine delegation to an important international conference on a ministerial level and as a result thereof, made substantive contributions to public interest and public welfare

Commander (CM) (Dakilang Kasugo) - Conferred upon an officer with a rank between career minister to foreign service officer class IV, or upon personnel of a government agency who serves as an Attache in a Foreign Service establishment, as recommended by the Chief of Mission or the Principal Officer of the post served, as the case may be, or by the Secretary of Foreign Affairs, in the case of personnel in the Home Office.

Member (MM) (Kasugo) - Conferred upon a staff officer or employee of the DFA, as recommended by the Chief of Mission or the Principal Officer of the post served, as the case may be, or by the Secretary of Foreign Affairs, in the case of personnel in the Home Office.

Recipients
 Lauro Baja
 Roy Cimatu
 Manuel Collantes
 León Ma. Guerrero
 Rafael Ileto
 Salvador Laurel
 Domingo Lucenario Jr.
 Diosdado Macapagal
 Federico M. Macaranas
 Leticia Ramos-Shahani
 Narciso Ramos
 Carlos P. Romulo
 Mamintal A.J. Tamano
 Arturo Tolentino
 Tony Tan Caktiong
 Enrique Manalo

Sources 
EXECUTIVE ORDER NO. 236 of September 19, 2003, ESTABLISHING THE HONORS CODE OF THE PHILIPPINES TO CREATE AN ORDER OF PRECEDENCE OF HONORS CONFERRED AND FOR OTHER PURPOSES .

External links
Gawad Mabini

 
Gawad Mabini
Establishments by Philippine presidential decree